The 1962 LPGA Championship was the eighth LPGA Championship, held October 4–7 at Stardust Country Club in Las Vegas, Nevada.

Judy Kimball, age 24, shot a final round 72 (+1) to win her only major title, four strokes ahead of runner-up Shirley Spork. The winner's share was $2,300 and second place earned $1,850. Kimball's 282 set a new record for the championship, three strokes ahead of Louise Suggs' 285 in 1957. Two-time defending champion Mickey Wright fell short in search of her third consecutive LPGA Championship; she finished thirteen strokes back in eighth place, but won her fourth LPGA Championship the following year.

It was the second of six consecutive LPGA Championships at Stardust, which opened the previous year. After several ownership and name changes, it became Las Vegas National Golf Club in 1998.

Past champions in the field

Source:

Final leaderboard
Sunday, October 7, 1962

Source:

References

External links
Las Vegas National Golf Club 

Women's PGA Championship
Golf in Las Vegas
LPGA Championship
LPGA Championship
LPGA Championship
LPGA Championship
Women's sports in Nevada